Muhammad Ayub may refer to:

 Muhammad Ayub (athlete) (1932–2008), Pakistani athlete
 Muhammad Ayub Khuhro (1901–1980), Pakistani politician
 Muhammad Ayub Sheikh, Pakistani politician